Tycho Lawson Collins (born October 20, 2001) is a Chinese-American footballer who plays as a forward for USL Championship side Memphis 901.

Career

Youth
Born in Shanghai, China, Collins also spent part of his childhood in Memphis, Tennessee with Lobo Rush between 2013 and 2015, winning two state titles.

In 2015, Collins moved overseas where he trialed and played in exhibition matches for clubs across three different countries. Starting with Shanghai SIPG, Collins would also spend various periods training with Chelsea in England, VVV-Venlo in the Netherlands and Shanghai Shenhua, also in China.

After a return trial with Shanghai SIPG during the summer of 2019, Collins returned to the United States where he finished high school in Boca Raton, Florida. He also spent time with club side Team Boca. After graduating in 2020, Collins trained for six months with Houston Dynamo.

On May 14, 2021, Collins signed with USL Championship side Memphis 901 on an academy contract, allowing him to remain eligible to play college soccer. He made his debut the following day, appearing as an injury-time substitute during a 2–1 win over Indy Eleven.

References

External links
 Profile at Memphis 901

2001 births
Living people
American soccer players
Chinese footballers
Association football defenders
Memphis 901 FC players
People from Memphis, Tennessee
People from Boca Raton, Florida
Soccer players from Florida
Soccer players from Tennessee
USL Championship players